Canalispira minor is a species of sea snail, a marine gastropod mollusk, in the family Cystiscidae.

References

minor
Gastropods described in 1927